The Ashok Leyland FAT 6×6 is an all-terrain military truck developed and produced by Indian automobile manufacturer Ashok Leyland. Designed for towing heavy artillery guns, it will replace the aging fleet of Scania SBAT111S used by the Indian Army.

Development
In 1986, when the Indian Army purchased 410 FH77B Bofors howitzers, they also ordered 660 SBAT111S trucks. 30 years later, these trucks had become obsolete and the Army looked for a replacement.

Ashok Leyland is one of the biggest suppliers of logistics vehicles to Indian Army; the company's Stallion truck has over 60,000 units in service with Indian Army. Thus, the development of FAT or Field Artillery Tractor was started as a private venture to replace the ageing fleet of Scania trucks.

Design & features
The truck is designed on Leyland's "Super Stallion" platform. It is powered by Ashok Leyland's in-house developed 8-litre Neptune series engine that gives  of power and 1,400 Nm of torque at 1,300 rpm. This is mated to an 8-speed manual transmission (2-speed transfer case). The truck runs on full-time 6-wheel drive system with all axles having differential lock.

The FAT 6x6's towing capacity is rated at 8 tonnes. The driver's cabin can hold four people and the crew cabin just behind it can hold six. The cargo bay is fitted with a 2.7 tonne crane for loading/unloading ammunition and other equipment. There is a roof hatch
for observation, emergency exit and firing. At the front, the truck has a 10 tonne self-recovery winch.

Other features include a fire and smoke detection unit, an infrared rear-view camera and Indeginised Rotex central tire inflation system. For driver's comfort, cab is equipped with HVAC.

Production
In March 2016, Ashok Leyland won a contract for supplying 450 units of the FAT 6x6 along with other "Super Stallion" vehicles and 825 units of "Ambulance 4x4" to the army. The total order was worth ₹800 crore. In 2017, the first batch of trucks was delivered.

References 

Military trucks of India
Ashok Leyland Defence Systems trucks
Six-wheeled vehicles
Artillery tractors